Arvid Rydman (25 June 1884 – 14 May 1953) was a Finnish gymnast who competed in the 1912 Summer Olympics. He was part of the Finnish team, which won the silver medal in the gymnastics men's team, free system event.

After his sporting career, Rydman worked as the director of Satakunta Museum in Pori from 1930 until his death. Rydman was married to Kerttu Snellman, the granddaughter of Finnish statesman Johan Vilhelm Snellman.

References

External links
profile

1884 births
1953 deaths
Finnish male artistic gymnasts
Gymnasts at the 1912 Summer Olympics
Olympic gymnasts of Finland
Olympic silver medalists for Finland
Olympic medalists in gymnastics
Directors of museums in Finland
Medalists at the 1912 Summer Olympics
20th-century Finnish people